Hope Odidika Uzodimma (born 12 December 1958) is a Nigerian politician who serves as Governor of Imo State. On 14 January 2020, the Supreme Court in Nigeria declared Hope Uzodimma of the All Progressives Congress (APC) winner of the 2019 governorship poll in Imo State nullifying the election of the then incumbent Governor Emeka Ihedioha.

Origin
Hope Uzodimma was born on 12 December 1958 in Omuma to an Igbo Catholic family; his father Chief Michael Uzodinma held the chieftaincy title of Igwe of Ozuh Omuma and his mother was Ezinne Rose Uzodimma (née Nneoha). He is a kinsman of the Okoro family of Etiti-Omuma. Uzodinma is a devout Catholic, and he is married to Chioma Uzodinma with seven children.

Concerning his secondary education, he stopped at class two, and claims to hold a Diploma in Maritime Management Technology, and Higher Diploma in the same field, from the Federal University of Technology Owerri. He also claims has a bachelor's degree in International Studies and Diplomacy from Washington University in St. Louis but reports indicate otherwise. Prior to his entry into politics, Uzodimma was a businessman with vast business interests.

Early political career
Hope Uzodimma began his political career during the Second Nigerian Republic, joining the ruling National Party of Nigeria (NPN), where in 1983, he became the Imo State youth leader. In the 1990s, with the aborted transition to the Third Nigerian Republic, Uzodimma featured prominently as a member of the United Nigeria Congress Party.

In 1999, after the return to democracy, Uzodimma joined the People's Democratic Party (PDP), where he served as a member of the party's National Caucus, National Executive Committee and on the Board of Trustees, at various times between 1999 and 2017. As a party boss in Imo State, Uzodimma was a close associate of the Governor Achike Udenwa until late 2002, when ahead of the April 2003 elections he decamped to the Alliance for Democracy (AD), becoming the party's candidate for the Imo State gubernatorial election. After losing the election to Udenwa, he returned to the PDP in February 2004. He later contested the PDP governorship primaries in December 2006, coming in second to Senator Ifeanyi Araraume. In 2011, after the incumbent Governor Ikedi Ohakim joined the PDP, Uzodimma endorsed him to run for a second-term as Governor of Imo State, favoring him over Rochas Okorocha who he later won.

In January 2011, Uzodimma won the PDP senatorial primary for the Imo West, gaining 2,147 votes, while the incumbent Senator Osita Izunaso came second with 891 votes. Uzodimma was later disqualified by a federal high court judgment as he had not been cleared by the PDP electoral panel led by Nwafor-Orizu. In March 2011, a court of appeal issued a stay of execution while the case was being decided, leaving Uzodimma free to campaign. On 5 April 2011 the Court of Appeal upheld the federal high court judgement, Uzodimma later appealed this decision at the Supreme Court. In the April 2011 elections, Uzodimma received 85,042 votes, ahead of former Governor Achike Udenwa of the Action Congress of Nigeria (ACN) with 64,228 votes and Rajis Okpalan Benedicta of the All Progressives Grand Alliance with 57,110 votes. In May 2011, the Supreme Court overturned the earlier decisions and declared that Uzodimma was the valid candidate and therefore had been elected.

Senate (2011– 2019) 
On 29 May 2011, Hope Uzodimma was sworn in as a Senator of the Federal Republic of Nigeria, representing Imo State (West Senatorial District). He was re-elected for a second term in the Senate during the 2015 election. In 2018, he left the Peoples Democratic Party and joined the ruling All Progressive Congress (APC) in order to contest for Governor of Imo State in the 2019 general elections.

Governor of Imo State 
In March 2019, the Independent National Electoral Commission sitting in Imo announced the governorship election results of Imo State: Emeka Ihedioha of the PDP who won with 273,404 votes, Uche Nwosu of Action Alliance with 190,364 votes, Ifeanyi Ararume of the All Progressives Grand Alliance with 114,676 votes; and Uzodimma in fourth place with 96,458 votes. Uzodimma later challenged the victory of Ihedioha up to the Supreme Court. On 14 January 2020, the Supreme Court declared Uzodimma, the duly elected Governor of Imo State. The court held that results from 388 polling units were wrongly excluded from votes ascribed to Uzodimma and the APC in Imo adding that the first appellant Uzodimma holds the majority of lawful votes cast.

On 15 January 2020, he and Placid Njoku were sworn in as the Governor of Imo State and Deputy Governor of Imo State respectively In his inaugural address, he ordered the states accountant general to provide a comprehensive financial status for the state from May 2010 to January 2020, he also ordered the permanent secretaries of all ministries in the state to forward the status of all contracts awarded, whilst halting the paying for all ongoing contracts.

Uzodimma's administration saw the outbreak of the Orlu Crisis and a military invasion by the Nigerian Army to uproot Biafran separatists.

Corruption 
On 11 November 2018, Uzodimma was allegedly arrested by a special investigation panel for the failure of one of his companies to execute a US$12 million contract for the dredging of Calabar channel. Uzodimma later denied ever being arrested, saying it was an attempt to stop his campaign for governor.

Titles 
He had the ceremonial title of Onwa-Netiri Oha of Omuma in Oru East local government of Imo State.

See also
List of Governors of Imo State

References

1958 births
Living people
Nigerian Roman Catholics
All Progressives Congress politicians
Imo State politicians
People from Imo State
Igbo people
Igbo politicians
Peoples Democratic Party members of the Senate (Nigeria)
People who fabricated academic degrees